Darcie Rose Brown (born 7 March 2003) is an Australian cricketer who plays as a pace bowler for the South Australian Scorpions in the Women's National Cricket League, and for the Adelaide Strikers in the Women's Big Bash League (WBBL). She made her international debut for the Australia women's cricket team in March 2021, and earned a contract with Cricket Australia the following month.

Early life
Born and raised in Kapunda, a town in the Barossa Valley of South Australia, Brown is part of a sporting family. She, her two older brothers and her father have played A grade cricket together for the Kapunda team in the Barossa and Light competition, and she has also teamed up with her mother for the Northern Jets in the South Australia Cricket Association first grade women's district tournament.

By the time Brown had reached her mid-teens, she was already participating in high level basketball, cricket, netball and Australian rules football competitions, and also playing tennis. In 2018, she was part of the national title-winning South Australian schoolgirl's netball team, and was selected for an Australian schoolgirl's netball tour of New Zealand. In October 2018, she scored 117 off 84 balls in Adelaide Premier Cricket, contributing to what is believed to be a world record score in a 50 over match, 3/596. In January 2019, she told the Barossa Herald that "I just want to play as many sports as possible, for as long as I can." Her greatest challenge as a sportswoman was that she needed to wear glasses, which slip when she is bowling.

In early 2019, Brown was named in the Australia under-19 women's cricket squad, to compete in a four-match series against a New Zealand emerging players side in March 2019. She also moved to Adelaide to start her school year 11 on a netball scholarship with the Henley High School sports program.

Career
A few weeks after returning from the March 2019 cricket tour of New Zealand, and after turning 16, Brown was awarded her first senior State contract, for the Scorpions. In October 2019, she signed for the Adelaide Strikers, becoming the youngest cricketer, male or female, to sign for the side.

Brown made her debut for the Scorpions on 9 January 2020. She debuted for the Strikers on 25 October 2020, in the sixth edition of the WBBL, taking three wickets.

In February 2021, Brown was named in Australia's limited overs squad for their series against New Zealand. She made her Women's Twenty20 International (WT20I) debut for Australia on 30 March 2021, against New Zealand. She made her Women's One Day International (WODI) debut for Australia on 10 April 2021, also against New Zealand.

In August 2021, Brown was named in Australia's squad for their series against India, which included a one-off day/night Test match as part of the tour. Brown made her Test debut on 30 September 2021, for Australia against India.

In January 2022, Brown was named in Australia's squad for their series against England to contest the Women's Ashes. Later the same month, she was named in Australia's team for the 2022 Women's Cricket World Cup in New Zealand. In May 2022, Brown was named in Australia's team for the cricket tournament at the 2022 Commonwealth Games in Birmingham, England.

References

External links

 
 
 Darcie Brown at Cricket Australia
 

2003 births
Living people
Australian women cricketers
Australia women Test cricketers
Australia women One Day International cricketers
Australia women Twenty20 International cricketers
Adelaide Strikers (WBBL) cricketers
People from Kapunda
South Australian Scorpions cricketers
Cricketers from South Australia
Netball players from South Australia
Australian netball players
Garville Netball Club players
Cricketers at the 2022 Commonwealth Games
Commonwealth Games gold medallists for Australia
Commonwealth Games medallists in cricket
21st-century Australian women
Medallists at the 2022 Commonwealth Games